True Story with Hamish & Andy is an Australian television series starring radio and television hosts Hamish Blake and Andy Lee, that was first aired on 5 June 2017. This is their third series for the Nine Network.

In July 2017, the Nine Network renewed the series for a second season. Season 2 began airing on 7 August 2018.

The series was repeated in blocks of 2 episodes from 8 February 2022, following broadcasts of The Hundred with Andy Lee.

Synopsis
The series saw Hamish & Andy sit down with everyday Australians who recount hilarious true stories that happened to them, with the events in the stories being recreated by Australian actors in filmed in comedic dramatisations.

Series overview

Episodes

Season 1 (2017)

Season 2 (2018)

Ratings

U.S. adaptation
In February 2020, it was announced that the series will be adapted for American audiences by US network NBC; it is hosted by actors Ed Helms and Randall Park, and the series is executive produced by Tim Bartley, Hamish Blake, Andy Lee, Ryan Shelton, Helms, Mike Falbo and Nicolle Yaron, who will also serve as showrunner, and it is produced by Warner Horizon in association with Pacific Electric Picture Co. and Universal Television Alternative Studio. In May 2021, it was announced that the series would be moving to Peacock. In December 2021, it was announced that the series would be titled True Story with Ed and Randall and premiered on January 20, 2022.

Home media
The first season was released on DVD on August 30, 2017. Some copies were scented with the duo’s “Andy by Hamish” fragrance. A selection of viral videos made to promote the series were included as extras on the release. The second season was not released on DVD, but has occasionally appeared on the Nine Network’s catch-up service 9Now.

In June 2022, both seasons appeared on local streaming service Stan alongside the duo’s next series, Hamish and Andy's “Perfect” Holiday.

See also

 List of Australian television series
 List of programs broadcast by Nine Network

References

External links 
 

2017 Australian television series debuts
Australian comedy television series
English-language television shows
Nine Network original programming
Hamish & Andy